The 2014 season was the current Tampa Bay Rowdies fifth season of existence, and fourth playing in the North American Soccer League, the second tier of American soccer pyramid. Including the original Rowdies franchise and the Tampa Bay Mutiny, this was the 27th season of a professional soccer team fielded in the Tampa Bay region.

Club 

as of October 20, 2014

Team management 

  Perry Van der Beck – Executive Vice President, General Manager, Technical Director, and Director of Player Development
  Lee Cohen – Director of Operations
  Ricky Hill – Head Coach
  Slobodan Janjuš – Goalkeeper Coach
  James Faylo – Head Athletic Trainer
  Patrick Horan – Team Physician

Competitions

Friendlies

NASL Spring season

Standings

Results summary

Results by round

Match reports

NASL Fall season

Standings

Results summary

Results by round

Match reports

U.S. Open Cup

Honors
NASL Fair Play Award

Transfers

In

Out

References 

Tampa Bay Rowdies (2010–) seasons
Tampa Bay Rowdies
Tampa Bay Rowdies
Sports in St. Petersburg, Florida